The Dr. Nathan Gaither House, at 100 S. High St. in Columbia, Kentucky was listed on the National Register of Historic Places in 1979.

It was a home of Dr. Nathan Gaither (1788-1862), who became a doctor and volunteered to receive the smallpox vaccination under development by Edward Jenner.  Gaither served as a surgeon in the War of 1812 and settled in Columbia by the end of that war.  He served as a doctor and in politics:  as an elected member of the Kentucky legislature from 1815 to 1818, and in the United States House of Representatives from 1829 to 1833.

References

National Register of Historic Places in Adair County, Kentucky
Federal architecture in Kentucky
Houses completed in 1814
1814 establishments in Kentucky
Columbia, Kentucky